Republic of Mosina was a short-lived microstate centred around the city of Mosina, which existed for five or six days in May 1848. The country was proclaimed on 3 May 1848, during the Greater Poland uprising, out of lands of insurrect-controlled lands of Grand Duchy of Posen, Kingdom of Prussia, with Jakub Krotowski-Krauthofer as its head of state. The republic ceased to exist five or six days later, on 8 or 9 May 1848 after the defeat of rebel forces.

The state was meant to be a temporary entity, that later would be reformed into an independent Polish state, that rebels had aimed to recreate. The capital of the country was Mosina and official language was Polish.

History 
In March 1848, during Greater Poland uprising, the insurrectionist forces had formed the National Commity in rebel-controlled city of Mosin, in Grand Duchy of Posen, Kingdom of Prussia, with Wojciech Rost, Antoni Adamski, Stanisław Stefanowicz, Jan Kordylewski and Antoni Ruszkiewicz as its members. On 3 May 1848, the leader of insurgent forces, Jakub Krauthofer-Krotowski had declared the formation of the independent Republic of Mosina in the area around the cities Mosina and Kórnik and made himself a head of state. The state was meant to be a temporary entity, that later would be reformed into an independent Polish state, that rebels had aimed to recreate. Mosin was decided to be the capital of the state. Following the declaration of the country's independence, Krotowski-Krauthofer had replaced Prussian government officials in the area with Polish ones, including appointing Wojciech Rost as the new mayor of Mosina.

The republic ceased to exist five days later, on 8 May 1848, after the rebels defeat in the battle of Rogalin, or a day later, on 9 May, after the clash in Trzebaw and following rebel capitulation in Bardo ending the uprising. Following the capitulation, Krauthofer-Krotowski was imprisoned in Konatrzewo.

References

Bibliography 
 Krótki sen o Polsce by Joanna Nowaczyk. Żołnierze Wolności [access date: 2019-04-26].
 Nieznana karta Wiosny Ludów. Polska miała przez 5 dni własną, niepodległą stolicę by Marcin Tomczak. histmag.org. [access date: 2019-04-26].
 Jakub Krotowski-Krauthofer in *Wielkopolski Słownik Biograficzny by Zdzisław Grot. Warsaw/Poznań. 1981.

States and territories established in 1848
States and territories disestablished in 1848
Former republics
Former countries in Europe
Former unrecognized countries
1948 in Germany
1948 in Poland
Greater Poland Uprising (1848)